Rayford Harold Robinson (26 March 1914 – 10 August 1965) was an Australian cricketer who played in one Test match in 1936. He played first-class cricket for New South Wales and South Australia from 1934/35 to 1939/40. After World War II he moved to New Zealand to coach in Dunedin and played first-class cricket for Otago from 1946/47 to 1948/49.

References

External links

1914 births
1965 deaths
Australia Test cricketers
New South Wales cricketers
Otago cricketers
South Australia cricketers
Australian cricketers
Cricketers from Newcastle, New South Wales
South Island cricketers
D. G. Bradman's XI cricketers